In Christian theology, traducianism is a doctrine about the origin of the soul holding that this immaterial aspect is transmitted through natural generation along with the body, the material aspect of human beings. That is, human propagation is of the whole being, both material and immaterial aspects: an individual's soul is derived from the soul of one or both parents. This implies that only the soul of Adam was created directly by God (with Eve's substance, material and immaterial, being taken from out of Adam), in contrast with the idea of creationism of the soul, which holds that all souls are created directly by God.

History

All Church Fathers agreed that the soul of Adam was directly created by God; they disagreed about whether humans thereafter were each given souls as a special act of creation, or whether souls were passed on to them the same way their bodies were. Tertullian actively advocated traducianism, the parental generation of souls. After the rise of Pelagianism, some theologians hesitated between traducianism and creationism, believing the former to offer a better, if not the only, explanation of the transmission of original sin. For Augustine, traducianism suggested a simple explanation for original sin, but he could not decide between it and creationism. In his writing to Saint Jerome, Augustine said, "If that opinion of the creation of new souls is not opposed to this established article of faith let it be also mine; if it is, let it not be thine." Jerome condemned it and said that creationism was the opinion of the Church, but he admitted that most of the Western Christians held traducianism. Gregory of Nyssa alone among the Greek Fathers leaned toward traducianism. Theodore Abu Qurrah, Macarius, Rufinus and Nemesius also favored that view. Clement of Alexandria laid the foundations for the creationist view. Ambrose of Milan drew a distinction between the creation of Eve's body from Adam's rib and the creation of her soul by citing Genesis 2:22: "the man said: "This one, at last, is bone of my bones and flesh of my flesh." He noted that it did not say "soul of my soul", but that can only mean that the souls of the first man and the first woman were both created separately and independently.

Creationism always prevailed in the East and became the general opinion of medieval theologians. Amongst the Scholastics, there were no defenders of traducianism. Alexander of Hales characterized creationism as the more probable opinion. All the other scholastics held creationism as certain and differed only in regard to the censure that should be attached to the opposite error. Accordingly, Peter Lombard asserted, "The Catholic Church teaches that souls are created at their infusion into the body." Saint Thomas Aquinas was more emphatic: "It is heretical to say that the intellectual soul is transmitted by process of generation." Hugh of Saint Victor and Hilary of Poitiers were creationists. Anselm of Canterbury was against traducianism.

There was a diversity of opinions among the remaining scholastics. Some held that the soul of a child is produced by the soul of the parents just as the body is generated by the parent body. Others maintained that all souls are created apart and are then united with their respective bodies, either by their own volition or by the command and action of God. Still others declared that the soul in the moment of its creation is infused into the body. Although for a time, the several views were upheld, and it was doubtful which came nearest the truth, the Church subsequently condemned the first two and approved the third. Gregory of Valencia spoke of "Generationism" as "certainly erroneous." Although there are no explicit definitions authoritatively put forth by the Catholic Church that would warrant calling Creationism to be de fide doctrine, there can be no doubt as to which view has been favored by ecclesiastical authority.

That the soul sinned in its pre-existent state and on that account was incarcerated in the body is regarded by the Catholic Church as a fiction that has been repeatedly condemned. Divested of that fiction, the theory that the soul exists prior to its infusion into the organism, while not explicitly reprobated, is obviously opposed to the doctrine of the Catholic Church according to which souls are multiplied correspondingly with the multiplication of human organisms. However, whether the rational soul is infused into the organism at conception, as the modern opinion holds, or some weeks subsequently, as medieval scholastics supposed, is an open question to some theologians.

Martin Luther, like Augustine, was undecided. John Calvin favoured creationism, as did Robert Baron. The Catholic Church postulates that the souls are created immediately at the moment of the conception. Pope Pius XII stated: "That the souls are created by God, it is the Catholic Faith that obliges us to accept."

Supporters

Traducianism was developed initially by Tertullian, who took a semi-materialistic view of the nature of the soul. It has been endorsed by Church Fathers such as Saint Gregory of Nyssa, Saint Anastasius Sinaita, and other theological figures in the early centuries of Christianity. Protestant advocates include various Lutheran Churches as well as some modern theologians such as Augustus H. Strong (Baptist), and Gordon Clark (Presbyterian), Lewis Sperry Chafer, Millard Erickson, Norman L. Geisler, and Robert L. Reymond.

W. G. T. Shedd says that the soul of any given individual is a part of the original soul given to Adam, and therefore is not originated in the act of procreation.

Arguments in support

Supporters of traducianism present arguments from the Bible such as: 
 Traducianists find support in Romans 5:12, "Therefore, just as through one person sin entered the world, and through sin, death, and thus death came to all, inasmuch as all sinned..." and 1 Corinthians "For just as in Adam all die, so too in Christ shall all be brought to life," 
 Foundational to the traducian position is the statement in Hebrews 7:10: "When Melchizedek met Abraham, Levi was still in the body of his ancestor."

 Since God is indivisible in both quality and nature, the creation of human souls cannot therefore be from some division beyond himself and not of his own substance and quality. It follows then that the creation of the human soul is the product of a merging and reconfiguration within God himself so therefore humanity, being made themselves in God's image and similarly constrained, would likewise generate and issue forth souls but not actually creating anything beyond divine providence. 

 Also, in the Nicene Creed, the Son was generated, not created, and the Holy Ghost proceeds from both the Father and the Son.

Arguments in opposition
Reasons for opposing the traducianism of human beings include the metaphysical argument that since humans cannot control their own existence, their existence cannot be caused by themselves; it must rather be caused by a necessary being otherwise known as God. Creation, in other words, includes God's on-going causation of human existence. This causation is through the human soul because, as Saint Thomas Aquinas argues, the human Soul has activities beyond the capacity of matter and the existence of these activities shows that the human soul is both immaterial and immortal---but not independent of God's causality. The Roman Catholic Church teaches that "every spiritual soul is created immediately by God - it is not "produced" by the parents, and also that it is immortal..." Humans have, however, free will and thus control over their own existence, as much as they are responsible for the act of procreation.

Traducianism contradicts the concept of the indivisibility of the soul. If the souls are incapable of division, then it is impossible for the soul of the child to be derived from the souls of the parents. But this is a merging and creation by two souls, and God would also have to divide himself in order to create a new one through his own substance. Also, in the Nicene Creed, the Son was generated, not created, and the Holy Ghost proceeds from both the Father and the Son.

The weakness of traducianism, to many theologians, is that it makes the generation of the soul dependent of the transmission of matter. Presbyterian theologian Charles Hodge held that since the nature of the soul is immaterial it could not be transmitted by natural generation.

Traducianism proceeds on the unproven assumption that God only works in a managerial manner after completing the creation of the world. Louis Berkhof points out that God continues to work immediately both in the performance of miracles and in some parts of the work of redemption.

See also

 Christian anthropology
 Christian mortalism
 Dualism (philosophy of mind)

References

Sources
 Traducianism by Gordon Clark, from the website of the Trinity Foundation

Christian anthropology